La Loggia is a comune in the Metropolitan City of Turin in the Italian region Piedmont. 

La Loggia may also refer to:

 Enrico La Loggia, an Italian politician
 Frank LaLoggia, an American film director, screenwriter, producer, and actor 
 Giuseppe La Loggia, an Italian politician.

See also 

 Loggia (disambiguation)